Doris Schade (21 May 1924 – 25 June 2012) was a German stage, radio, and film actress.  She was born in Bad Frankenhausen, Germany.

Filmography

External links

Hannelore Dietrich Agency Munich 

1924 births
2012 deaths
People from Bad Frankenhausen
German film actresses
German television actresses
German radio actresses
20th-century German actresses
21st-century German actresses